Cimoideais a superfamily of rather specialized, highly evolved sea slugs and sea snails, (marine gastropod mollusks) within the infraclass "Lower Heterobranchia" .

Families
 Cimidae Warén, 1993
Synonyms
 Graphididae J.C. N. Barros, Mello, F. N. Barros, S. Lima, Santos, Cabral & Padovan, 2003: synonym of  Cimidae Warén, 1993
 † Tofanellidae Bandel, 1995: synonym of  Cimidae Warén, 1993
 † Subfamily Usedomellinae Gründel, 1998: synonym of  Cimidae Warén, 1993

References

 Jensen, R. H. (1997). A Checklist and Bibliography of the Marine Molluscs of Bermuda. Unp. , 547 pp
 Bouchet P., Rocroi J.P., Hausdorf B., Kaim A., Kano Y., Nützel A., Parkhaev P., Schrödl M. & Strong E.E. (2017). Revised classification, nomenclator and typification of gastropod and monoplacophoran families. Malacologia. 61(1-2): 1-526

 Heterobranchia
Gastropod superfamilies